"Closure" is the third and last single from Chevelle's second album, Wonder What's Next. It has a dark, melodic verse that carries into a similarly melodic chorus ending in heavy guitar chords. The following verse continues with added aggression into the second chorus and heavy bridge.

A music video was produced for "Closure". It consists entirely of live performance footage.

The song was briefly covered by Breaking Benjamin in 2004 and 2005.

Charts

References

External links
 
 [ Chevelle - Artist Chart History]

2002 songs
2003 singles
Chevelle (band) songs
Songs written by Pete Loeffler
Songs written by Sam Loeffler
Song recordings produced by Garth Richardson